Massimo Salvadè (born 29 August 1971) is an Italian figure skater. He competed in the pairs event at the 1992 Winter Olympics.

References

1971 births
Living people
Italian male pair skaters
Olympic figure skaters of Italy
Figure skaters at the 1992 Winter Olympics
Sportspeople from Como